Dayal Patterson is a British author.

Patterson has written several non-fiction books about heavy metal music and has contributed to a number of metal magazines, such as Decibel, Terrorizer and Metal Hammer. His trilogy of books on black metal, Black Metal: Evolution of the Cult, Black Metal: The Cult Never Dies Vol. One. and Black Metal: Into the Abyss, have been labelled 'essential reading' for black metal enthusiasts. Following this work, he has given talks on the history of metal at events and festivals such as Midgardsblot.

In 2013, he founded the publishing house Cult Never Dies, which specialises in materials relating to underground metal.

Selected works 

 Black Metal: Evolution of the Cult
 Black Metal: The Cult Never Dies Vol. One
 Black Metal: Into the Abyss
 Owls, Trolls & Dead King's Skulls: The Art Of David Thiérrée
 Non Serviam: The Official Story Of Rotting Christ

References 

Living people
Year of birth missing (living people)